'Abimbola Lagunju (born in 1960 in Ibadan) is a Nigerian writer. He studied medicine in St Petersburg, Russia from 1979 to 1987.  He returned to Nigeria in the middle of the economic crisis engendered by the World Bank/IMF Structural Adjustment Program imposed on Nigeria. It was a Nigeria quite different from what he had left in 1979. The Middle Class to which he now belonged was destitute. He later wrote in The Children of Signatures:
 

The socio-economic melt-down of his country prompted his interest to shift from ideological idealisms to questioning the harsh political economy experiments visited on developing countries, particularly fragile sub-Saharan African countries by the Bretton Woods Institutions. The relationship between these institutions and African countries would later become a regular subject in his writings.

He left Nigeria for Portugal with his family in 1993, and after a brief stint of working and studying in Lisbon, he found a job as a Development Aid worker. This experience exposed him to the arduous and seemingly unending plight of extreme poverty of rural African peoples. He has written extensively on the relationship between African leaders and their citizens. In his novel, Days of Illusions, he blames the local politicians who are directly responsible for the precarious existence of their citizens, and also the poor people for allowing themselves to be manipulated by the local politicians.

In addition to numerous articles in Nigeria’s online media, his works span four literary genres: poetry, political essays, political satires and short stories.

Abimbola Lagunju has authored fourteen books.

Books by Abimbola Lagunju include:

Cyclones of the Human Heart

The Shadow of Rainbow

The Children of Signatures

The African in the Mirror

The Days of Illusions

In the Embrace of Fear

Fouta Celebrates Life

The Pelting March of the Storm

Gaddafi’s Gaffes

Verses from Under the Sands

Gombii and Other Short stories

When Civilization Kicked Us in the Face On the African Bus

This is Not Yet My Story

A Civil Society of One (Selected Published Articles)

Cyclones of the Human Heart  
Abimbola Lagunju, drawing upon timeless African memories, has provided us with a poetry of images, a notebook of observations and a portfolio of perceptive musings.
We are swept along upon a mystery tour of his imagination, stopping only to consider grand themes, simple human tableaux and personal revelations...Whether we are navigating through the macrocosm or investigating the microcosm, we find that he has been there before us......This is a fine collection of poems that covers the full range of human experience from love and awe, to injustice and betrayal......

The Shadow of Rainbow  
The Shadow of Rainbow is a collection of poems inspired by the author’s view of current day Africa and its place in the world today vis-à-vis the developed world.
The collection covers diverse topics, including African politics, relationships between states, love, friendship and war. It is a glimpse of the world seen from the point of view of an African passionate about inspiring the creation by Africans of a more just future for Africa......

The Children of Signatures 
The Children of Signatures embodies mixed feelings of love and disappointment. While it expresses profound love for Africa, it also portrays the problems facing the continent as self-induced. With flashback into history, it draws parallels with the present state of the continent and challenges Africa to view its problems from a moral mirror. Simple in language, rich in depth and imagery, the collection also touches on other aspects of life..........

The African in the Mirror 
The African in the Mirror takes us through the predicament of Black Africa from slavery times till the present day. It seeks to establish the cause of vulnerability of the African in his relationship with the outside world and his historical predisposition to self-inflicted catastrophes. The book analyses different diagnoses and solutions that have been proffered to African economic and political problems and proves the futility of these solutions. It propounds the theory of societal relational energy dynamics and seeks to explain the problems that Africa faces through its choice of distribution of this energy.
It challenges black Africa to rise up to its historical responsibility to redeem itself and the black race.

The Days of Illusions  
Hillview, a densely populated and poor working class neighbourhood is the melting pot for all those who dream to make it to the Plateau, the plush city centre, a seemingly unrelated appendage to the squalor in the country. It is also a rallying point for those who had made it to the Plateau and rolled down its very steep sides. Disillusioned by the persistent failure of politicians to deliver on many pre-election promises and crushed under the weight of economic hardships, Hillview inhabitants conclude that they are on the brink of imminent extinction. Under the guidance of the local barman, the Association for the Prevention of Extinction (APE) intended to secure funds from the IMF and the WWF is conceived. The struggle to occupy important posts in the APE leads to an early break up of the association into three factions.
Akinola Igwe, an easy going, honest and law-abiding inhabitant of Hillview and a reluctant leader of one of the factions of APE soon becomes entangled in intrigues, manipulations, and threats…..
Days of Illusions is a satire on contemporary African politics.

In the Embrace of Fear 
For centuries, Africa has lived with fear and has, at a great cost adapted itself to its vagaries. The challenges of the modern world have not only made this approach obsolete but very dangerous to the continued survival of Black Africa. Survival can no longer be taken as a given. Africa must struggle for it. This struggle entails concerted efforts to move away from basic existence to sustainable quality of life. Africa must rise up to this challenge. The cost of ineptitude in the face of fear is dispersion and extinction.
In the Embrace of Fear seeks to demystify Black African manacling fear through a frank non-narcissistic self-examination.

Fouta Celebrates Life 
In the pursuit of the Right to Life, both the government and the governed have obligations. The government has the irreducible minimum obligations to provide high quality, easily accessible, sufficient and efficient social goods and services to the public; and to inform the public, not only of the existence of these services, but also of their inalienable rights to them. The public, on the other hand, has the obligation to demand free-from market forces life-enhancing social goods and services. If any of the two parties is deficient in their obligations, life, from conception through old age loses its sacredness and exists only as a commodity in the hands of market forces.
Despite all the odds, Fouta courageously celebrates life in style….

The Pelting March of the Storm – Co-authored with Okey Nwanyanwu 
In the Pelting March of the Storm is a collection of poems about historical and contemporary African existential tragedy. It laments the helplessness of Africans in the face of man-generated and natural calamities, and encourages a renaissance forged on strong identity, self-pride and determined self-driven recovery. 

Gaddafi’s Gaffes
Muammar Gaddafi, the President of Libya since 1969 is probably one of the most controversial presidents in the world. His theatrics and sayings have intrigued and confounded even the most loyal of his admirers.
Gaddafi’s Gaffes is a collection of quotes from Gaddafi’s speeches and declarations. The book highlights the contradictions, inconsistencies, absurdity and the comic nature of some of Muammar Gaddafi’s thoughts and declarations

Verses from Under the Sands 
Verses from Under the Sands is a collection of poems on the African situation from the colonial times to present dispensation. The poems highlight the relationship lose-win between Sub-Sahara Africa and the outside world and also between Africans themselves.
Many of the poems highlight the failure of the duty bearers at the politico-economic and the traditional guardianship levels towards the suffering masses oppressed by systems and establishments which ought to protect and cater for them. Some poems focus on the hopes and aspirations, the immediate survival reactions and the accepted-as-their-destiny helpless attitude of the downtrodden in the face of the failure of their leaders. 

Gombii and Other Short stories 
Gombii and Other Short Stories is a collection of sad and funny stories. These are stories of lost traditional values and tragic consequences of misunderstood imported and borrowed systems in rural and urban Africa.

When Civilization Kicked Us in the Face On the African Bus 
When Civilization Kicked Us in the Face On the African Bus is a satirical story of the views of Africans riding On the African Bus on their past and their present, their local and foreign leaders, their traditional and imported religions, the savagery of politics in their environment and their different survival strategies. The book portrays in a very comical way, how the international community sees and relates with African leaders.

This is Not Yet My Story 
This Is Not Yet My Story is a fictional account of the life of a senior citizen from the age of five years. Mr. Ibukun Irewole, the narrator takes us through his travail-free early years in Tilane and the different challenges he had in adult years. He had brushes with the Russian KGB, the German Polizei and on many occasions, with the authorities of his country. He sees himself as a victim of many injustices……

Abimbola Lagunju is married with three children and lives in Ibadan, Nigeria.

References

Living people
1960 births
Nigerian male poets
Writers from Ibadan
Yoruba writers
20th-century Nigerian poets
Nigerian expatriates in Portugal
21st-century Nigerian poets
Yoruba people